Joseph Shanahan B.Sc., C.S.Sp. (1871–1943)  was an Irish-born priest of the Congregation of the Holy Spirit (Spiritans), who served as a bishop in Nigeria – first as prefect apostolic of Lower Niger (now Onitsha) and then as vicar apostolic of Southern Nigeria.

Life
Born Joseph Ignatius Shanahan on 6 June 1871 in Glankeen, Borrisoleigh, County Tipperary, Ireland. He joined the Holy Ghost Order in Beauvais, France in 1886, where his uncle Pat Walsh (Brother Adelm) had also joined the Holy Ghost Fathers. 
He returned to Ireland, to Rockwell College, where he served as Prefect and Dean of Studies. He was ordained in 1900 in Blackrock College, and went to Nigeria in 1902.

He was instrumental in the setting up of the Kiltegan Fathers when in 1920, following his ordination in Maynooth as Bishop for Southern Nigeria (then a British protectorate) he appealed to students in Maynooth College for missionaries to Nigeria and Africa.

In 1924 Bishop Shanahan founded a missionary society for women, the Missionary Sisters of the Holy Rosary, in Killeshandra, County Cavan, Ireland.

Bishop Shanahan died at Nairobi, Kenya, on Christmas Day 1943 aged 72 years, and was initially buried in the community cemetery in St Mary's School in Nairobi, Kenya. However, in January 1956 his remains were brought back to Nigeria for the "second burial" in the Cathedral Basilica of the Most Holy Trinity, Onitsha.

References

People from County Tipperary
19th-century Irish Roman Catholic priests
Holy Ghost Fathers
Irish Spiritans
Roman Catholic missionaries in Nigeria
20th-century Roman Catholic bishops in Nigeria
1871 births
1943 deaths
Roman Catholic bishops of Onitsha